Erysichton lineata, the hairy lineblue, is a butterfly in the family Lycaenidae. The species was first described by Richard Paget Murray in 1874. It is found in New Guinea and along most of the eastern coast of Australia, from Queensland to New South Wales.

The wingspan is about 20 mm. Adult females are brown with a large white patch on each forewing, and a blue sheen near the hinges. The hindwings have a black eyespot at the tornus. Adult males are blue.

The larvae feed on the flowers of Syzygium francisii, Ehretia acuminata, Macadamia integrifolia, Brachychiton acerifolium and Arytera lautereriana.

Subspecies
Erysichton lineata lineata (Queensland: Claudie River to New South Wales: Kiama)
Erysichton lineata cythora (Fruhstorfer, 1916) (Tanimbar, Buru, Ambon, Serang, Obi, Bachan)
Erysichton lineata insularis Tite, 1963 (Trobriand, D'Entrecasteaux, Louisiade Archipelago)
Erysichton lineata meiranganus (Röber, 1886) (Aru, Kai, Manam, Karka, Admiralty Island)
Erysichton lineata uluensis (Ribbe, 1899) (New Britain, New Ireland, New Hanover, Witu, St. Matthias, Squally Islands)
Erysichton lineata vincula (Druce, 1891) (Solomons)

References

Butterflies described in 1874
Polyommatini
Taxa named by Richard Paget Murray
Butterflies of Oceania